Exetasis is a genus of small-headed flies. It is known from Brazil and Argentina.

Species
 Exetasis brasiliensis Carrera, 1947
 Exetasis calida (Wiedemann, 1830)
 Exetasis eickstedtae Schlinger, 1972
 Exetasis jujuyensis Gillung in Barneche, Gillung & González, 2013
 Exetasis longicornis Erichson, 1840
 Exetasis tumens Walker, 1852

References

Acroceridae
Nemestrinoidea genera
Diptera of South America
Taxa named by Francis Walker (entomologist)